The Azkarra is a two-seat three-wheel all-electric sports concept car of 2016, and the first vehicle ever built by Canadian company Atelier Girfalco Limitée. The two passengers sit side by side. 

Although production was initially set to begin in 2017 with first deliveries scheduled for the Spring of 2017, the company has not been successful in getting the car into production.

The unveiling of the Azkarra concept occurred in December 2016. "It promises to be one of the fastest accelerating cars in production" and "To Give Supercars A Run For Their Money"

The Azkarra was featured during the Ball for the 75th Anniversary of the Montreal International Auto Show, held on October 12, 2017 at La Tohu.

References

Further reading
http://www.drivespark.com/four-wheelers/2016/girfalco-azkarra-electric-three-wheeler-teased/slider-pf52018-019237.html

Electric concept cars

Electric sports cars
Three-wheeled motor vehicles